Neroli  is the fourteenth solo studio album by English musician Brian Eno, released in 1993.

Conceived as a single piece, Eno describes this in the liner notes as fulfilling his ambient prescription: "to reward attention, but not so strict as to demand it". Single notes resonate throughout the piece in a seemingly random but harmonic pattern that shifts quietly for close to an hour.  The piece's calming nature is typical of Eno’s distinctive "discreet music,” premiered with the eponymous 1975 composition that has been implemented in some maternity wards to instill a sense of calm and enhance the organic nature of childbirth. (According to the notes accompanying the CD, Eno intended to release a longer version of "Discreet Music" for just that purpose.)

Track listing
Composed by Brian Eno.
"Neroli: Thinking Music, Part IV" – 57:56
"New Space Music (Bonus Track)" - 01:01:24

References

External links 

 

1993 albums
Brian Eno albums
Albums produced by Brian Eno
All Saints Records albums